The Lorimer Street station is a local station on the BMT Jamaica Line of the New York City Subway. Located at the intersection of Lorimer Street and Broadway in Brooklyn, it is served by the J train at all times except weekdays in the peak direction and the M train at all times except late nights. The Z train skips this station when it operates.

History
This station opened on June 25, 1888 as part of a westward extension of the Broadway Elevated to Driggs Avenue with the final terminus of Broadway Ferry opening a few weeks later. Upon the opening of the Williamsburg Bridge tracks, trains were rerouted after Marcy Avenue to Delancey Street (later renamed Essex Street station).

Station layout

There are two side platforms and three tracks. The center track is used by the J and Z trains in the peak direction weekday midday and rush hours. Both platforms have beige windscreens and red canopies with green frames and support columns. Some sections of the windscreen feature mesh to allow a view of the streets below. The station name plates are in the standard black with white lettering.

The 2002 artwork here is called Roundlet Series by Annette Davidek. It features 16 stained glass panels on the platform windscreens that are 36 inches tall and 36 inches wide. They all have a floral and vine theme.

Exits

This station has two entrances/exits. The full-time side is an elevated station house beneath the tracks on the northwest end. Inside fare control, it has one staircase to each platform at their extreme ends and a waiting area that allows a free transfer between directions. Outside fare control, there is a turnstile bank, token booth, and two staircases to the street. One goes down to the northwest corner of Broadway and Lorimer Street while the other goes down to the southeast peninsula formed by Throop Avenue, Lorimer Street, and Broadway. The northbound platform has an additional staircase going up to a work level above the mezzanine.

The station's other entrance/exit is unstaffed and has a sealed elevated station house beneath the tracks. A single staircase from each platform goes down to the station house landing, where a single high entry/exit turnstile provides entrance/exit from the system. Another staircase then goes down to either western corner of Wallabout Street and Broadway.

Broadway on the IND Crosstown Line is about two blocks to the west from the full-time entrance at Lorimer Street. Despite demands from G riders, there is no permanent free transfer from Lorimer Street to there; a free transfer was temporarily created in Summer 2014 due to the Hurricane Sandy-related shutdown of the IND Crosstown Line under the Newtown Creek. A free transfer using a MetroCard between Broadway and Lorimer Street stations was provided during the 14th Street Tunnel shutdown from April 2019 until May 31, 2020 during weekends and late nights. The transfer was honored through the end of May 2020, even though L train tunnel work was completed on April 26.

References

External links 
 
 
 Station Reporter — J Train
 Station Reporter — M Train
 The Subway Nut — Lorimer Street Pictures
 MTA's Arts For Transit — Lorimer Street (BMT Jamaica Line)
 Lorimer Street entrance from Google Maps Street View
 Platforms from Google Maps Street View

BMT Jamaica Line stations
1888 establishments in New York (state)
New York City Subway stations in Brooklyn
Railway stations in the United States opened in 1888